The soundtrack to Licence to Kill, the 16th Eon Productions James Bond film, was released by MCA Records in 1989.

Because the usual James Bond composer John Barry (who had scored almost every film from From Russia with Love onwards) was not available at the time as he was undergoing throat surgery after suffering a rupture of the esophagus in 1988, the soundtrack's more upbeat and suspenseful score was composed and conducted by Michael Kamen.

Initially Eric Clapton and Vic Flick were asked to write and perform the theme song to Licence to Kill. The theme was said to have been a new version based on the "James Bond Theme". The guitar riff heard in the original recording of the theme was played by Flick. A track purporting to be the unused Clapton/Flick theme was uploaded to the music sharing website SoundCloud in January 2022 and was later confirmed to be genuine.

The prospect, however, fell apart and Gladys Knight's song and performance was chosen, later becoming a Top 10 hit in the United Kingdom. The song was composed by Narada Michael Walden, Jeffrey Cohen and Walter Afanasieff, based on the "horn line" from Goldfinger, which required royalty payments to the original writers. At 5 minutes 13 seconds it is the longest Bond theme, though 45 single releases featured a shorter edit, running 4 minutes 11 seconds. The version used in the movie itself was edited to 2 minutes 53 seconds. Uniquely, the credits for the song (writers and performer) are not included in the opening titles. The music video of "Licence to Kill" was directed by Daniel Kleinman, who later took over the reins of title designer from Maurice Binder for the 1995 Bond film, GoldenEye.

All the instrumental tracks are amalgams of various sequences and musical cues from the film rather than straight score excerpts. The end credits of the film feature the song "If You Asked Me To" sung by Patti LaBelle. Though the song was a top ten R&B charter and a minor pop hit for LaBelle, in 1992, the song was covered by and became a much bigger hit for singer Céline Dion. The track "Wedding Party", used during the wedding of Felix Leiter to Della Churchill, makes reference to the track "Jump Up" from the first Bond film, Dr. No.

Track listing
 "Licence to Kill" – Gladys Knight
 "Wedding Party" – Ivory
 "Dirty Love" – Tim Feehan
 "Pam"
 "If You Asked Me To" – Patti LaBelle
 "James & Felix on Their Way to Church"
 "His Funny Valentine"
 "Sanchez Is in the Bahamas/Shark Fishing"
 "Ninja"
 "Licence Revoked"

See also
 Outline of James Bond

References

Soundtrack albums from James Bond films
Soundtrack
1989 soundtrack albums
MCA Records soundtracks
Michael Kamen albums